is a Nippon Professional Baseball catcher for the Orix Buffaloes in Japan's Pacific League.

External links

1978 births
Hokkaido Nippon-Ham Fighters players
Japanese baseball coaches
Japanese baseball players
Living people
Nippon Ham Fighters players
Nippon Professional Baseball coaches
Nippon Professional Baseball catchers
Nippon Professional Baseball first basemen
Orix Buffaloes players
Baseball people from Okayama Prefecture
Yomiuri Giants players